SCOLA may refer to:

 Satellite Communications for Learning
Sutton College, a school in London formerly known as Sutton College of Learning for Adults
 Second Consortium of Local Authorities - a later development of the CLASP system of prefabricated schools constructed in England in the second half of the 20th century
 Scola Tower, tower in Porto Venere, Italy

People 
 Scola (surname)
 Rufus Waller (born 1978), R & B musician who performed under the name Scola